Daniel James Palmer is an American novelist who also writes as D.J. Palmer. He is the son of the novelist Michael Palmer.

Early life and education
Palmer was born in Boston, Massachusetts, United States. He graduated from Boston University with a political science major and returned to receive his MA in Mass Communication.

Writing
Palmer began to pursue writing after the dotcom wave disrupted his previous technology career and led him to begin writing about his thoughts through short stories. He took his previous technology background and incorporated that into the themes of his thriller novels. His first, the techno-thriller Delirious, follows the downfall of an electronic guru, Charlie, whose own GPS invention unravels a murder trail. Like Delirious, Palmer’s subsequent novels attempt to expose and create fear of the hidden dangers of today's popular technology. Palmer has co-written two short stories with his father Michael Palmer, both for International Thriller Writers publications.  The first story, "Disfigured", appeared in Thriller: Stories to Keep You Up at Night, edited by James Patterson.  His second collaboration, "The Dead Club", was published in the First Thrills Anthology edited by Lee Child. A novel, Trauma, written with his father is to be released on May 12, 2015.

Music
Palmer taught himself to play guitar and performed in the Boston club scene with various bands for several years. Palmer has recorded two albums: Alien Love Songs (2000) and Home Sweet Home (2007), both of which were produced by Don DiLego of Velvet Elk Studios. Palmer's music style is influenced by both Americana and classic rock traditions. Retail clothier J.Crew licensed Palmer's song “Perfect Place to Be” for commercial use.

Novels
Delirious (2011)
Helpless (2012)
Stolen (2013)
Desperate (2014)
Trauma, with Michael Palmer (2015)
Constant Fear (2015)
Mercy, with Michael Palmer (2016)
Forgive Me (2016)
The First Family, with Michael Palmer (2018)
Saving Meghan (2019), as D.J. Palmer
The New Husband (2020), as D.J. Palmer
The Perfect Daughter (2021), as D.J. Palmer
My Wife Is Missing (2022), as D.J. Palmer

References

External links
Daniel Palmer's homepage
BookReporter.com biography

1962 births
Living people
Writers from Boston
Boston University College of Arts and Sciences alumni
American thriller writers
American male novelists
Boston University College of Communication alumni
Novelists from Massachusetts